Tirkesh may refer to:
Tirkesh, Azerbaijan
Tirkesh, Iran (disambiguation)